Jan David Col (6 April 1822 – 19 February 1900) was a Belgian painter known for his anecdotal genre scenes.

Life and work
He was born in Antwerp and received his initial artistic training at the Royal Academy of Fine Arts in Antwerp with Nicaise De Keyser. His first solo exhibition came in 1846, and he gained immediately popularity with his mildly humorous scenes from daily life. His early works show the strong influence of Jean-Baptiste Madou and, especially, Ferdinand de Braekeleer. 

He often collaborated with other artists, such as Constant Boon (1830–1882), who also did genre scenes, who painted farm animals (primarily chickens) and Henriëtte Ronner-Knip, who specialized in cats.

Col died in 1900 in Antwerp. His works may be seen in the Royal Museum of Fine Arts Antwerp and the Groeningemuseum in Bruges, as well as at various museums in Brussels, Chicago, Cincinnati, Montreal and Rostock. His paintings are still regularly sold at auction.

Selected paintings

Source 
 Berko, P. & V.: Dictionnaire des peintres belges nées entre 1750 et 1875, Editions Laconti, Brussels, 1981

External links 

 More works by Col @ ArtNet

1822 births
1900 deaths
Belgian painters
Belgian genre painters
Artists from Antwerp